Kangen Band is a Malay Pop music group from Indonesia which was formed on July 4, 2005 in Bandar Lampung by Dodhy Hardianto and his friends. The band often changes personnel. However, the band turns into full formation in 2020.

History
In 2008, Kangen Band launched their third album, Bintang 14 Hari. Bintang 14 Hari presents a different color of music by featuring Malay elements and exploring Javanese elements. On this album, Kangen hooked arranger Andi Bayou with Eren's backing vocals.

References 

Malaysian musical groups